Tephrocyon is an extinct genus of  the Borophaginae subfamily of canids native to North America.
It is a rarely found genus, with fossil deposits only occurring in western Nebraska, Wyoming, eastern Oregon, New Mexico, and north Florida. It was an intermediate-sized canid, and more predatory than earlier borophagines.

References

Further reading
The Biology and Conservation of Wild Canids by David W. Macdonald and Claudio Sillero-Zubiri; page 42 

Borophagines
Miocene canids
Serravallian extinctions
Prehistoric carnivoran genera
Miocene mammals of North America
Burdigalian first appearances